Turcopalpa africana is a moth in the family Gelechiidae. It was described by Povolný in 1968. It is found in Sudan, Egypt, Saudi Arabia and southern Iran.

References

Gnorimoschemini
Moths described in 1968